Super Hits is the first of two compilation albums in the Super Hits series featuring songs by country singer Willie Nelson.The album was certified 2× Platinum by the RIAA for sales of 2 million copies. As of April 2017, the album has sold 2,919,300 copies in the United States.

Track listing

Critical reception

Super Hits received three out of five stars from Stephen Thomas Erlewine of Allmusic. Erlewine concludes that the album is "not bad" but "far from definitive."

Chart performance
Super Hits peaked at No. 34 on the U.S. Billboard Top Country Albums chart the week of July 22, 1995.

Weekly charts

Year-end charts

Super Hits, Volume 2

The success of the album resulted in the release of a second volume in 1995. This volume did not repeat the success of the first.

Track listing

References

1994 greatest hits albums
Willie Nelson compilation albums